Lobivine is a phenethylamine alkaloid found in Lophophora williamsii.

See also
Less functionalized
 Homarylamine
 3,4-Methylenedioxyphenethylamine

More functionalised
 Methylenedioxydimethylamphetamine

References

Phenethylamine alkaloids
Dimethylamino compounds
Benzodioxoles